Mahesh Mahadevan was an Indian film composer in the 1990s. Over the last decade of the 20th century, Mahesh composed more than 250 popular advertising jingles including the extremely popular Regaul Blue jingle. He also composed the music for six very successful multi-language motion pictures.

Personal life and death

In the decade before his death, Mahesh was actively involved in cancer counselling and in motivating other cancer patients to approach treatment with a positive attitude.

He died in October 2002 due to cancer.

Upon his death, The Mahesh Memorial Trust (MMT) was formed in 2002 by friends of Mahesh. MMT committed itself to building a paediatric Ward in the Cancer Institute premises at Adyar, Chennai. The required funds were raised with the help of friends and well wishers. The Trustees personally committed their time in overseeing the entire execution of the project from design through construction to completion.

Career

Besides composing music, he handled his business and creative interests. An MBA from XLRI, Jamshedpur, he was a Director of Finance and Administration at Real Image Media Technologies. Prior to this, he worked in various capacities as a Corporate Manager in companies including Chennai based India Pistons Prvt 
Ltd.

Discography

References

External links
 

 

Tamil musicians
Tamil film score composers
1955 births
2002 deaths
Jingle composers
People from Tamil Nadu
20th-century Indian musicians
Special Mention (feature film) National Film Award winners
XLRI – Xavier School of Management alumni